Checotah is a town in McIntosh County, Oklahoma, United States. It was named for Samuel Checote, the first chief of the Creek Nation elected after the Civil War. Its population was 3,481 at the 2000 census.  According to Census 2010, the population has decreased to 3,335; a 4.19% loss.

Checotah is home to numerous antique malls, a Civil War battle site, and a downtown historic district.  Checotah claims to be the steer wrestling capital of the world. Early boosters called Checotah "The Gem of the Prairie".

History

The Missouri–Kansas–Texas Railroad (also known as the MKT or Katy) established a railhead on the old Texas Road in 1872 that became the site of present-day Checotah. Although it was named Checote Switch for Samuel Checote, a later mapmaker spelled the name as Checotah. The town was chartered by the Creek Nation in 1893. The Dawes Commission held its first meeting here.

Between 1907 and 1909, the people of Checotah were involved in a dispute with nearby Eufaula known as the McIntosh County Seat War. After Checotah was designated as the new county seat, the people of Eufaula refused to hand over the county records. Soon after, a group of heavily armed men from Chectotah attempted to seize the records from the courthouse in Eufaula, but were beaten back and forced to surrender during the gunfight that followed. Eufaula was designated as the permanent seat of McIntosh County one year later.

Checotah was on the route of the Jefferson Highway established in 1915, with that road running more than 2,300 miles from Winnipeg, Manitoba to New Orleans, Louisiana.

Geography
Nearby is Eufaula Lake, the largest-capacity lake wholly within the state of Oklahoma.

Demographics

As of the census of 2000, 3,481 people, 1,389 households, and 912 families were residing in the city. The population density was 389.3 per square mile (150.3/km2). The 1,576 housing units had an average density of 176.3 per square mile (68.1/km2). The racial makeup of the city was 67.91% White, 6.92% African American, 15.91% Native American, 0.23% Asian, 0.09% Pacific Islander, 0.40% from other races, and 8.53% from two or more races. Hispanics or Latinos of any race were 1.29% of the population.

Of the 1,389 households, 31.5% had children under 18 living with them, 44.9% were married couples living together, 17.7% had a female householder with no husband present, and 34.3% were not families. About 31.5% of all households were made up of individuals, and 18.4% had someone living alone who was 65  or older. The average household size was 2.39, and the average family size was 2.98.

In the city, the age distribution was 26.1% under 18, 8.2% from 18 to 24, 23.7% from 25 to 44, 20.3% from 45 to 64, and 21.7% who were 65 or older. The median age was 39 years. For every 100 females, there were 77.7 males. For every 100 females 18 and over, there were 72.5 males.

The median income for a household in the city was $22,029, and for a family was $30,741. Males had a median income of $26,094 versus $17,298 for females. The per capita income for the city was $15,921. About 16.1% of families and 20.4% of the population were below the poverty line, including 23.4% of those under 18 and 7.6% of those 65 or over. The median house value is $50,500.

National Register of Historic Places

Checotah has multiple sites on the National Register of Historic Places listings in McIntosh County, Oklahoma, including the Checotah Business District (Gentry Ave between W 1st and W Main Sts., and Broadway Ave between Lafayette and Spaulding Aves), Checotah City Hall (201 N Broadway), Checotah MKT Depot (Paul Carr Dr.), the Methodist Episcopal Church (South) (419 W. Gentry St.), the Oklahoma Odd Fellows Home at Checotah (211 W North St.), and the Tabor House (631 W. Lafayette).

Honey Springs Battlefield
Checotah considers itself the host of the Honey Springs Battlefield, which is 4.5 miles (7.2 km) northeast of town.

Popular culture
 American Idol winner Carrie Underwood wrote a song on her album Some Hearts called "I Ain't in Checotah Anymore". It includes references to the local high-school team (Wildcats), Highways 69 and 40, the Okra Fest (no longer held), and Eufaula Lake.

Notable people
 Mel McDaniel, country musician
 Paul H. Carr, Silver Star recipient
 Woody Crumbo, Native American artist, lived and worked in Checotah during the later part of his career.
 Merle Haggard's parents James Francis Haggard and Flossie Mae Harp
 Jim G. Lucas (1914–1970), Journalist and war correspondent, winner of Pulitzer Prize in Journalism and two-time winner of Ernie Pyle Journalism award 
 Tracy Scroggins, NFL linebacker
 Carrie Underwood, Grammy Award-winning country musician and American Idol season-four winner and country music's reigning queen

References

External links
 Official website
 Checotah High School
 Encyclopedia of Oklahoma History and Culture – Checotah

Cities in McIntosh County, Oklahoma
Cities in Oklahoma